{{Infobox military person
|name=Johannes Block
|birth_date=
|death_date=
|birth_place=
|death_place= 
|image=Johannes Block (cropped).jpg
|image_size=
|caption=
|nickname=
|allegiance=
|branch=Army (Wehrmacht)
|serviceyears=
|rank=General of the Infantry
|commands=[[VIII Army Corps (Wehrmacht)|VIII Army Corps]]XIII Army CorpsLVI Panzer Corps
|unit=
|battles=
Vistula–Oder Offensive
|awards=Knight's Cross of the Iron Cross with Oak Leaves
|laterwork=}}

Johannes Block (17 November 1894  – 26 January 1945) was a German general in the Wehrmacht during World War II who held commands at division and corps level. He was a recipient of the Knight's Cross of the Iron Cross with Oak Leaves. Block was killed on 26 January 1945 near Kielce, Poland during the Soviet Vistula-Oder Offensive.

Awards and decorations
 Iron Cross (1914) 2nd Class (5 July 1916) & 1st Class (22 August 1918)
 Clasp to the Iron Cross (1939) 2nd Class (8 September 1939) & 1st Class (10 September 1939)
 Knight's Cross of the Iron Cross with Oak Leaves
 Knight's Cross on 22 December 1941 as Oberst and commander of 202nd Infantry Regiment
 Oak Leaves on 22 November 1943 as Generalleutnant'' and commander of 294th Infantry Division

References
Citations

Bibliography

 
 

1894 births
1945 deaths
People from Złotów County
People from West Prussia
German Army generals of World War II
Generals of Infantry (Wehrmacht)
German Army personnel of World War I
Prussian Army personnel
German Army personnel killed in World War II
Collaborators who participated in the Beer Hall Putsch
Recipients of the clasp to the Iron Cross, 1st class
Recipients of the Knight's Cross of the Iron Cross with Oak Leaves
Reichswehr personnel
Nazis who participated in the Beer Hall Putsch
20th-century Freikorps personnel